Guinate is a village in the municipality of Haría in northern Lanzarote in the Las Palmas province of Spain (the Eastern Canary Islands).

The village has a large (45000 m2) tropical park which has numerous bird species, including penguins, and many plants and animals. On the coast there is El Mirador de Guinate which has fine views of the coast and of several small islands.

Populated places in Lanzarote